Farmdale station is an at-grade light rail station on the E Line of the Los Angeles Metro Rail system. The station is located in the center median of Exposition Boulevard at its intersection with Farmdale Avenue, after which the station is named, in the West Adams neighborhood of Los Angeles.

History 
Originally a stop on the Los Angeles and Independence and Pacific Electric railroads, it closed on September 30, 1953, with closure of the Santa Monica Air Line and remained out of service until re-opening on Saturday, April 28, 2012. It was completely rebuilt for the opening of the Expo Line from little more than a station stop marker. Regular scheduled service resumed Wednesday, June 20, 2012.

In the Expo Phase 1 project's Final Environmental Impact Report (EIR), the Expo Authority recommended (and the Metro Board approved) an at-grade crossing at Farmdale Avenue.  Some members of the community, as well as the LAUSD, objected to the at-grade crossing, citing safety concerns for students of Dorsey High School (which is adjacent to the crossing). On February 20, 2009, the California Public Utilities Commission (CPUC) denied the Expo Authority's request for an at-grade crossing.  In response, on July 29, 2009, the Expo Authority proposed four alternatives to grade separation.  One of these proposals, a station at Farmdale, was reviewed by the assigned Administrative Law Judge of the CPUC.  In her written decision dated March 22, 2010, the judge ruled that the Farmdale Station could be added to the project by including a CPUC-approved Addendum to the Final EIR, without having to redo the entire project's EIR.  The final decision to authorize the grade crossing (and thus, construction of Farmdale Station) was made by the commission on July 29, 2010.
All trains operating on the Expo line would be required to come to a complete stop at the Farmdale station, which features near-side stations at the intersection of Farmdale Avenue, thus increasing safety for pedestrians and students in the area.

Service

Station layout 

The station has "nearside" platforms: this means that the platforms are positioned on opposite sides of the intersection, and trains stop at the platform before crossing the intersection.

Hours and frequency

Connections 
, the following connections are available:
 Los Angeles Metro Bus:

Notable places nearby 
The station is within walking distance of the following notable places:
 Susan Miller Dorsey High School
 Michelle and Barack Obama Sports Complex

References 

E Line (Los Angeles Metro) stations
Railway stations in Los Angeles
West Adams, Los Angeles
Railway stations in the United States opened in 2012
Railway stations in the United States opened in 1875
Railway stations closed in 1953
1875 establishments in California
1953 disestablishments in California
2012 establishments in California
Pacific Electric stations